Streptomyces iranensis is a bacterium species from the genus of Streptomyces which has been isolated from rhizospherical soil in Isfahan in Iran.

See also 
 List of Streptomyces species

References

Further reading

External links
Type strain of Streptomyces iranensis at BacDive -  the Bacterial Diversity Metadatabase	

iranensis
Bacteria described in 2010